A sallong is an ornamental fringe hung from the browband of a horse's bridle, or from a phalera.  It functions also to discourage flies.

A less ornamental form of this fringe, hung from the browband, is known also as a fly fringe or mosquero.

See also
Fly mask

Horse protective equipment
Horse ornamentation